Joël Gouhier (born 22 October 1949) is a French former racing driver. He raced in the 24 Hours of Le Mans from 1983 until 1986, where he returned to the series in 1993 and retiring in 1994. He also raced in the 24 Hours of Spa.

Racing record

24 Hours of Le Mans results

References

1949 births
Sportspeople from Eure-et-Loir
Living people
French racing drivers
24 Hours of Le Mans drivers
World Sportscar Championship drivers
24 Hours of Spa drivers

Larbre Compétition drivers